Green hydrogen (GH2 or GH2) is hydrogen generated by renewable energy or from low-carbon power. 
Green hydrogen has significantly lower carbon emissions than grey hydrogen, which is produced by steam reforming of natural gas, which makes up the bulk of the hydrogen market. Green hydrogen produced by the electrolysis of water is less than 0.1% of total hydrogen production. It may be used to decarbonize sectors which are hard to electrify, such as steel and cement production, and thus help to limit climate change.

The high cost of production is the main factor behind the low use of green hydrogen. Nonetheless, the hydrogen market is expected to grow, with some forecasts of the cost of hydrogen production falling from $6/kg in 2015 to around $2/kg by 2025. In 2020, major European companies announced plans to switch their truck fleets to hydrogen power.

Green hydrogen can be blended into existing natural gas pipelines, and also used to produce green ammonia, the main constituent of fertilizer production. It is suggested by hydrogen industry bodies that green ammonia will be cost-competitive with ammonia produced conventionally (grey ammonia) by 2030.

Definition 
Green hydrogen is produced by using renewable energy to power the electrolysis of water.

Certified green hydrogen requires an emission reduction of >60-70% (depending on the certification body) below the benchmark emissions intensity threshold (= GHG emissions of grey hydrogen, for example benchmark values according to the renewable energy directive RED II).

Market
The high cost of production is the main factor behind the low use of green hydrogen. Nonetheless, the United States Department of Energy forecasts that the hydrogen market is expected to grow, with the cost of hydrogen production falling from $6/kg in 2015 to as low as $2/kg by 2025. The price of $2/kg is considered a potential tipping point that will make green hydrogen competitive against other fuel sources. Green hydrogen is a more economical means of long-term renewable energy storage in terms of capital expenditures than pumped-storage hydroelectricity or batteries.

The majority of hydrogen produced globally in 2020 is derived from fossil fuel sources with 99% of hydrogen fuel coming from carbon-based sources, and is not green hydrogen. Green hydrogen has significantly lower carbon emissions than grey hydrogen, which is produced by steam reforming of natural gas and represents 95% of the market. On the contrary, green hydrogen, specifically, that produced by electrolysis of water represents less than 0.1% of total hydrogen production.

Uses

Transportation
Hydrogen can be used as a hydrogen fuel for fuel cells or internal combustion engines. Hydrogen vehicles are not limited to automobiles, with trucks also being designed to run on green hydrogen. In 2020, major European companies announced plans to switch their truck fleets to hydrogen power. Additionally, hydrogen-powered aircraft are already being designed by Airbus, with a planned release of the first commercial aircraft by 2035. Nevertheless, Airbus has warned that hydrogen will not be widely used on aircraft before 2050.

Heating
Hydrogen can be used for cooking and heating within homes. Hydrogen heating has been proposed as an alternative to power most UK homes by 2050. The British government intends to launch demonstration projects to show how the fuel can power regions containing hundreds of homes.

Natural gas industry 
Natural gas pipelines are sometimes used to transport hydrogen, but it is not without challenges. Many pipelines would need to be upgraded for hydrogen transport. The natural gas industry and its infrastructure could pose a roadblock to green hydrogen adoption for countries that intend to be carbon neutral. A pilot program in Cappelle-la-Grande‚ France has already mixed hydrogen into the gas grid of 100 homes. Natural gas-fired power plants can also be converted to burn hydrogen serving to provide backup power during periods of high demand.

Green ammonia production

Green hydrogen can be used to produce green ammonia, the main constituent of fertilizer production. The Hydrogen Council suggested in 2021 that green ammonia will be cost competitive with ammonia produced conventionally (gray ammonia) by 2030.

Economy
As of 2020, the global hydrogen market was valued at $900 million and is expected to reach $300 billion by 2050. According to analysts at Fitch Solutions, the global hydrogen market could jump to 10% by 2030. The number of investments in green hydrogen has risen from almost none in 2020 to 121 gigawatts across 136 projects in planning and development phases totaling over $500 billion in 2021. 

As of 2021, companies across countries have formed alliances to increase production of the fuel fifty-fold in the next six years. The market could be worth over $1 trillion a year by 2050 according to Goldman Sachs.

Africa
Mauritania has launched two major projects on green hydrogen: NOUR Project, one of the world’s largest hydrogen projects with 10 GW of capacity by 2030 in cooperation with Chariot company. The second is EMAN Project, which include 18GW of wind capacity and 12GW of solar capacity to produce 1.7 million tons per annum of green hydrogen or 10 million tons per annum of green ammonia for local use and export, in cooperation with Australian company CWP.
Countries in Africa such as Morocco, Tunisia, Egypt and Namibia have proposed plans to have green hydrogen as a part of their overall climate change goals. Namibia is partnering with European countries such as Netherlands and Germany for feasibility studies and funding.

Australia
An energy market analyst suggested in early 2021 that the price of green hydrogen would drop 70% over the coming 10 years in countries which have cheap renewable energy. In 2020, the government fast tracked approval for the world's largest planned renewable energy export facility in the Pilbara region. In 2021, energy companies announced plans to construct a "hydrogen valley" in New South Wales at a cost of $2 billion which would replace the region's coal industry.

As of July 2022, the Australian Renewable Energy Agency (ARENA) has invested $88 million in 35 hydrogen projects ranging from research and development projects with universities, to first-of-a-kind demonstrations. In 2022, ARENA expects to reach financial close on two or three of Australia’s first large-scale electrolyzer deployments as part of its $100 million hydrogen deployment round.

Canada 
EverWind Fuels developer of green hydrogen and ammonia production and E.ON Hydrogen GmbH, agreed on a detailed Memorandum of Understanding to import green ammonia at scale to Germany beginning in 2025 from EverWind’s initial production facility in Point Tupper, Nova Scotia.

Under the MoU, EverWind and E.ON intend to work towards an offtake agreement for up to 500,000 tonnes per annum of green ammonia. The facility is expected to reach commercial operation in early 2025.

Asia

China
China is the leader of the global hydrogen market with an output of 20 million tons, accounting for ⅓ of global production. Sinopec aims to generate 500,000 tonnes of green hydrogen by 2025. Researchers from the Harvard China Project have indicated that hydrogen generated from wind energy could provide a cost effective alternative for coal-dependent regions like Inner Mongolia. As part of preparations for the 2022 Winter Olympics a  hydrogen electrolyzer, described as the "world's largest" began operations to provide fuel for vehicles used at the games. The electrolyzer produced green hydrogen using onshore wind.

Japan
In order to become carbon neutral, the Japanese government intends to transform the nation into a "hydrogen society". The energy demand in Japan would require the government to import 36 million tons of liquefied hydrogen. The nation's commercial imports are projected to be 100 times less than this amount by 2030, when the use of the fuel is expected to commence, which represents a serious challenge. Japan has published a preliminary road map that called for hydrogen and related fuels to supply 10% of the power for electricity generation as well as a significant portion of the energy for other uses like shipping and steel manufacture by 2050. Japan has created a hydrogen highway consisting of 135 subsidized hydrogen fuels stations and plans to construct 1,000 by the end of the 2020s.

Oman
A consortium of companies have announced a $30 billion project in Oman, which would become one of the largest hydrogen facilities in the world. Construction will begin in 2028. By 2038 the project will be powered by 25  of wind and solar energy.

United Arab Emirates 
In 2021, in collaboration with Expo 2020 Dubai a pilot project was launched which is the first "industrial scale", solar-driven green hydrogen facility in the Middle East and North Africa."

Saudi Arabia 
In 2021, Saudi Arabia, as a part of the NEOM project, announced an investment of $5bn to build a green hydrogen-based ammonia plant, which would start production from 2025.

India 

Reliance Industries and Adani Group - two of India's largest Energy companies announced a foray into green hydrogen production in 2021. Reliance Industries announced its plan to use about 3 gigawatt (GW) of solar energy to generate 400,000 tonnes of hydrogen. Gautam Adani, founder of the Adani Group announced plans to invest $70 billion to become the world's largest renewable energy company, and produce the cheapest hydrogen across the globe. The power ministry of India has stated that India intends to produce a cumulative 5 million tonnes of green hydrogen by 2030. 

In April 2022, the public sector Oil India Limited (OIL), which is headquartered in eastern Assam’s Duliajan, set up India’s first 99.99% pure green hydrogen pilot plant in keeping with the goal of “making the country ready for the pilot-scale production of hydrogen and its use in various applications” while “research and development efforts are ongoing for a reduction in the cost of production, storage and the transportation” of hydrogen.

South Korea 
In October 2020, the South Korean government announced its plan to introduce the Clean Hydrogen Energy Portfolio Standards (CHPS) that emphasizes the use of clean hydrogen. During the introduction of the Hydrogen Energy Portfolio Standard (HPS), it voted by the 2nd Hydrogen Economy Committee. In March 2021, the 3rd Hydrogen Economy Committee was held to pass a plan to introduce a clean hydrogen certification system based on incentives and obligations for clean hydrogen.

In June 2021, Hyundai Engineering signed a mutual business agreement with POSCO, Gyeongsangbuk-do, Uljin-gun, Pohang University of Science and Technology, Pohang Institute of Industrial Science and the Korea Atomic Energy Research Institute. It plans to secure MMR technology competitiveness and revitalize the hydrogen economy through cooperation such as developing hot hydrogen production technology, developing hot water electrolytic technology, and commercializing nuclear power.

European Union
In July 2020 the European Union unveiled the Hydrogen Strategy for a Climate-Neutral Europe with the goal of reaching carbon neutrality by incorporating hydrogen into EU plans. A motion backing this strategy passed the European Parliament in 2021. The plan will be divided in three phases. The first one, from 2020 to 2024, will aim at decarbonizing all existing hydrogen production. The second phase (2024-2030) will integrate green hydrogen into the energy system. The third phase (2030 to 2050) will see a large-scale deployment of hydrogen in the decarbonization process. Goldman Sachs estimates hydrogen will be 15% of the EU energy mix by 2050. 

Six European Union member states: Germany, Austria, France, the Netherlands, Belgium and Luxembourg, requested hydrogen funding be backed by legislation. Germany has already invested €9 billion to construct 5  of hydrogen capacity by 2030. Many member countries have created plans to import hydrogen from other nations, especially from North Africa. These plans would increase hydrogen production, however they have also been accused of trying to export the necessary changes needed within Europe. The European Union has required that starting in 2021, all new gas turbines made in the bloc must be equipped ready to burn a hydrogen–natural gas blend.

In February 2021, thirty companies announced a pioneering project to provide hydrogen based in Spain. The project intends to start in 2022, creating 93  of solar and 67 GW of electrolysis capacity by the end of the decade. In April 2021, Portugal announced plans to construct the first solar-powered plant to produce hydrogen by 2023. Lisbon based energy company Galp Energia has announced plans to construct an electrolyzer to power its refinery by 2025.

Latin America
In November 2020, Chile's president presented the "National Strategy for Green Hydrogen," stating he wanted Chile to become "the most efficient green hydrogen producer in the world by 2030". The plan includes HyEx, a project to make solar based hydrogen for use in the mining industry.

United Kingdom 
In 2021, the British government published its policy document, a "Ten Point Plan for a Green Industrial Revolution," which included investing to create 5  of low carbon hydrogen by 2030. The plans include work with the industry to complete the necessary testing that would allow up to 20% blending of hydrogen into the gas distribution grid for all homes on the gas grid by 2023. Though a BEIS consultation in 2022 suggested that grid blending would only have a "limited and temporary" role due to an expected reduction in the use of natural gas.

In March 2021 a proposal emerged to use offshore wind proposal in Scotland to power converted convert oil and gas rigs into a "green hydrogen hub" which would supply fuel to local distilleries. 

In June 2021 Equinor announced plans to triple UK hydrogen production. In March 2022 National Grid announced a project to introduce green hydrogen into the grid with a 200m wind turbine powering an electrolyzer to produce gas for about 300 homes.

In the early 2020s energy firms including ERM, Source Energie and RWE announced interest in generating green hydrogen using floating wind turbines in the Celtic Sea. 

Vattenfall hopes to generate green hydrogen from a test offshore wind off Aberdeen in 2025.

United States 
During his 2003 State of the Union Address, President George W. Bush unveiled a $1.2 billion plan to develop hydrogen fuel cell vehicles dubbing it "freedom fuel." This funding was reduced in 2009 by Barack Obama.

The Federal Infrastructure Investment and Jobs Act, which became law in November 2021, allocates  $9.5 billion to green hydrogen initiatives. In 2021, the U.S. Department of Energy (DOE) was planning the first demonstration of a hydrogen network in Texas. The department had previously attempted a hydrogen project known as Hydrogen Energy California. Texas is considered a key part of green hydrogen projects in the country as the state is the largest domestic producer of hydrogen and already has a hydrogen pipeline network. In 2020, SGH2 Energy Global announced plans to use plastic and paper via plasma gasification to produce green hydrogen near Los Angeles. 

In 2021 then New York governor Andrew Cuomo announced a $290 million investment to construct a green hydrogen fuel production facility. Authorities in the state have backed plans for developing fuel cells to be used in trucks and research on blending hydrogen into the gas grid. In March 2022 the governors of Arkansas, Louisiana, and Oklahoma announced the creation of a hydrogen energy hub between the states. Australia-based Woodside has announced plans for a green hydrogen production site in Ardmore, Oklahoma. In August 2022 President Joe Biden signed the Inflation Reduction Act of 2022, establishing a 10-year production tax credit, which includes a $3.00/kg subsidy for green hydrogen.

Research and development 

Albeit multiple green hydrogen technologies already exist, there is ongoing research and development for novel technological pathways for "green hydrogen". For instance, in 2020 scientists reported the development of micro-droplets for algal cells or synergistic algal-bacterial multicellular spheroid microbial reactors capable of producing oxygen as well as hydrogen via photosynthesis in daylight under air.

In 2020, the European Commission adopted a new dedicated strategy on hydrogen in the EU which includes research and innovation in line with the European Green Deal. The "European Green Hydrogen Acceleration Center" is tasked with developing a €100 billion a year green hydrogen economy by 2025.

In December 2020, the United Nations together with RMI and several companies, launched Green Hydrogen Catapult, which agitates to bring the cost of green hydrogen below US$2 per kilogram (equivalent to $50 per megawatt hour) by 2026.

In 2021, with the support of the governments of Austria, China, Germany and Italy, UN Industrial Development Organization (UNIDO) launched its Global Programme for GH2in Industry. It stimulates the accelerated uptake and deployment of GH2 in industries of developing countries and transition economies. It aims to build partnerships for knowledge and technology transfer and cooperation.

Integration with Electricity Networks 
There is extensive interest in possible integration of green hydrogen with existing forms of renewable energy. Particularly, there are current interests focused on using green hydrogen as a carbon-neutral solution to address the difficulties of integrating renewable energy resources into the electrical grid. One of the biggest issues with direct integration of solar and wind energy into the grid is the risk of unbalanced supply or demand in the electric grid from the intermittent behavior of the renewable energy resources. During peak wind or daylight periods, oversupply of energy into the grid can be equally as damaging as not being able to supply enough electricity to match the usage demands. Green hydrogen can act as a stabilizing energy storage device. Existing water electrolysis methods such as alkaline water electrolysis are vulnerable to risks that can arise if the source of energy for the electrolysis is unable to be maintained at the peak capacity and can cause evolved hydrogen to encounter evolved oxygen, running the risk of explosion at the electrolyzer and requiring the disabling of the electrolysis system to flush out the hydrogen. One proposed solution is to use chitin, which is produced at over 100 billion tons a year from nature in forms such as crude shrimp shell waste, as a potentially scalable biomass resource to act as an alternative to oxygen evolution in the hydrogen generation process. This would lead to the consumption of chitin and water to produce hydrogen and acetic acid, which avoids the risk of hydrogen-oxygen reaction and maintains scalability. By running this process using the solar energy from photovoltaic solar panels, hydrogen gas can be generated that falls under the category of green hydrogen. This also has an economic incentive of being able to produce acetic acid at yields of between 73.7 to 77.5% as a byproduct that could be used or sold.

Green hydrogen production from seawater 
As part of an interest in examining sustainable hydrogen fuel for maritime shipping and in response to concerns of freshwater scarcity, a 2020 study into the various means of electrolysis for green hydrogen from seawater as a source of water have been conducted. Four such methods, direct electrolysis of seawater, alkaline electrolysis, proton-exchange membrane electrolysis, and solid oxide electrolysis, are briefly summarized. Direct electrolysis of seawater follows known processes, forming an electrolysis cell in which the seawater acts as the electrolyte to allow for the reaction at the anode, 2 Cl- (aq)->{Cl2(g)} + 2e-and the reaction at the cathode, 2 {H2O(l)}+2e- -> {H2}(g) + 2{OH- }(aq). The inclusion of magnesium and calcium ions in the seawater makes the production of alkali hydroxides possible that could form scales in the electrolyzer cell, cutting down on lifespan and increasing the need for maintenance. The electrolyte can easily get contaminated, but the alkaline electrolyzer can operate under pressure to improve energy consumption. The electrodes can be made of inexpensive materials and there's no requirement for an expensive catalyst in the design. Similar to the alkaline electrolyzer, the proton exchange membrane electrolyzer can operate at higher pressures, reducing the energy costs required to compress the hydrogen gas afterwards, but the proton exchange membrane electrolyzer also benefits from rapid response times to changes in power requirements or demands and not needing maintenance, at the cost of having a faster inherent degradation rate and being the most vulnerable to impurities in the water. Solid oxide electrolyzers run the reactions {{O^2^-}(g)}->{1/2{O2}(g)}+2{e^-}at the anode and {{H2O}(g)}+2{e^-}->{{H_2}(g)}+{O^2^-}(g) at the cathode.The solid oxide electrolyzers require high temperatures to operate, generating superheated steam. They suffer from degradation when turned off, making it a more inflexible hydrogen generation technology. In a selected series of multiple-criteria decision-analysis comparisons in which highest priority was placed on economic operation costs followed equally by environmental and social criteria, it was found that the proton exchange membrane electrolyzer offered the most suitable combination of values (e.g., investment cost, maintenance and operation cost, resistance to impurities, specific energy for hydrogen production at sea, risk of environmental impact, etc.), followed by the alkaline electrolyzer, with the alkaline electrolyzer being the most economically feasible, but more hazardous in terms of safety and environmental concerns due to the need for basic electrolyte solutions as opposed to the solid polymers used in proton-exchange membranes. Due to the methods conducted in multiple-criteria decision analysis, non-objective weights are applied to the various factors, and so multiple methods of decision analysis were performed simultaneously to examine the electrolyzers in a way that minimizes the effects of bias on the performance conclusions.

See also 
Hydrogen economy
Alternative fuel
Carbon-neutral fuel
Fossil-fuel phase-out

References

External links
 Green hydrogen explainer video from Scottish Power

 
Emerging technologies
Emissions reduction